Omphalea queenslandiae is a liana in the spurge family. It is native to north-eastern Australia.

Description
The species grows as a woody vine on rainforest trees. Its stem has a diameter of up to 15 cm and exudes a red sap when cut. The leaves are 12–22 cm long by 6.5–12 cm wide. The flowers have fleshy tepals, concave on the inner surface; the female flowers are 5–10 mm in diameter; the male flowers are smaller, about 2 mm long. The fleshy fruits grow up to about 8 by 12.5 cm in size and contain round seeds 3.5–4 cm in diameter.

Distribution and habitat
The species is endemic to the Wet Tropics of Queensland where it occurs in lowland and upland rainforest from sea level to an elevation of 750 m.

References

 
queenslandiae
Endemic flora of Australia
Flora of Queensland
Rosids of Australia
Vines
Plants described in 1889
Taxa named by Frederick Manson Bailey